The women's duet was one of two events in the synchronized swimming program at the 1984 Summer Olympics. The final was held on August 9.

Results

Technical figures

Qualification

Final

References

1984
1984 in women's sport
Women's events at the 1984 Summer Olympics